City Pacific is an Australian company established in 1997 by Phil Sullivan as a financial investment manager. It is the holder of Australian Financial Services Licence, and was listed on the ASX in July 2001.

History
On 14 January 2008, City Pacific launched a $1.4 billion scrip bid for Gold Coast operator MFS Limited (now Octaviar), however the bid failed.

Redemptions and distributions have been frozen since early 2008, and the First Mortgage Fund has been declared illiquid by CP.

The chairman of the board of directors is Phillip Graeme Downie (FCA).

Recent events
On 3 August 2009, receivers and managers were appointed to the company following a court decision that awarded control of a mortgage fund, the companies principal source of income as its manager, to rival Balmain Trilogy.

This followed City Pacific freezing redemptions on the fund and unitholders voicing their anger at the companies management fees for controlling the fund.  In October 2008, Phil Sullivan, a former bankrupt, left the fund partly as a result of death threats made against him.

On 16 June 2018, Mr Sullivan (allegedly) entered into another Bankruptcy agreement with his administrators.

Business units
 Funds Management
 City Pacific First Mortgage Fund
 City Pacific Income Fund
 City Pacific Managed Fund
 City Pacific Private Fund
 City Pacific Treasury Finance
 Property
 CP1 Limited 
 Indigo Pacific Capital Ltd 
 Grande Pacific
 City Pacific Project Management
 Financial Services
 City Pacific Finance
 CityPac Home Loans
 City Pacific Marina Finance
 Australian Beneficial Finance

See also
 City Pacific Finance Stakes

References

External links
 
 Company profile, InvestSmart.

Financial services companies established in 1997
Defunct investment companies of Australia